Berberović is a surname. Notable people with the surname include:

 Džemal Berberović (born 1981), Bosnian football player
 Nefisa Berberović (born 1999), Bosnian tennis player

Bosnian surnames